Forever Changed is the ninth studio album by T. Graham Brown. It was nominated for a Grammy in the category of Roots Gospel at the 57th Annual Grammy Awards. The album peaked at No. 7 on Billboard's Heatseekers chart and at No. 37 on their Country Albums chart.

Track listing

Track information and credits verified from Discogs, AllMusic, and the album's liner notes.

Musicians

T. Graham Brown – Vocals
Kelly Back – Acoustic Guitar, Electric Guitar
Steve Brewster – Drums
Pat Coil – Keyboards, Piano
Eric Darken – Percussion
Mark Fain – Bass Guitar
David Hungate – Bass Guitar
Rob Ickes – Dobro
Brent Mason – Electric Guitar
James Mitchell – Electric Guitar
Lonnie Wilson – Drums
Bruce Watkins – Acoustic Guitar, Arranger, Session Leader
John Willis – Banjo, Acoustic Guitar
The J-Horn Section – Horn
John Ketchings – Cello
Sam Levine – Flute, Saxophone
Gary Prim – Keyboards, Piano
Gayle Mayes – Background Vocals
Angie Primm – Background Vocals
Mark Carman – Keyboards, Piano
David Floyd – Orchestration
The Booth Brothers – Vocals (Track 9)
Jeff & Sheri Easter – Vocals (Track 6)
Jason Crabb – Vocals (Tracks 3, 8)
Jimmy Fortune – Vocals (Track 13)
Steve Cropper – Electric Guitar, Vocals (Track 8)
Sonya Isaacs – Vocals (Track 11)
Three Bridges – Vocals (Track 10)
Leon Russell – Vocals (Tracks 5, 8)
The Oak Ridge Boys – Vocals (Track 8)

Production

T. Graham Brown – Producer
Mark Carman – Producer, Arranger, Executive Producer
Alan Silverman – Mastering
Sheila Brown – Project Coordinator
Joe Carrell – Engineer
Jared Clement – Second Engineer
Vince Gill – Featured Artist
William Lee Golden – Cover Photo
Courtney Groennert – Production Assistant
Bonnie Hartle – Production Assistant
Tim Higginbotham – Vocal Editing

Charts

References

2015 albums
T. Graham Brown albums